Razmanjan (also Razmangund as Razmanjān; also known as Razmengān, Razmenjan, and Razmanjon) is a village in Ramjerd-e Do Rural District, Dorudzan District, Marvdasht County, Fars Province, Iran. At the 2006 census, its population was 514, in 129 families.

References 

Populated places in Marvdasht County